Nuest may refer to:
 NU'EST, a South-Korean boyband formed in 2012
 12504 Nuest, a main-belt asteroid